A Case for Solomon is a 2012 non-fiction, book by Tal McThenia and Margaret Dunbar Cutright chronicling the disappearance and possible recovery of 4 year-old Bobby Dunbar in 1912 Opelousas, Louisiana.

References

2012 non-fiction books
1912 in Louisiana
Simon & Schuster books